Lalari Yek (also Romanized as Lalarī Yeḵ, meaning "Lalari 1"; also known as Lalarī) is a village in Tang-e Haft Rural District, Papi District, Khorramabad County, Lorestan Province, Iran. At the 2006 census, its population was 103, in 23 families.

References 

Towns and villages in Khorramabad County